Hot Rail is the third studio album by the rock band Calexico. It was released in 2000 through Quarterstick Records. A limited deluxe edition was released on November 15, 2010.

Track listing

The EU version of the album contains the additional track "Crystal Frontier" (Burns) between "Fade" and "Untitled III".

Personnel

Calexico
Joey Burns – bass, guitar, cello, voice, loops, accordion, organ
John Convertino – drums, vibes, marimba, organ, percussion, accordion

Additional musicians
Marianne Dissard – voice (2)
Tim Gallagher – pedal steel (9)
Nick Luca – guitar (1, 7, 11, 13)
Rob Mazurek – cornet (4)
Ruben Moreno – trumpet (1, 2, 7, 13)
Craig Schumacher – harmonica (11), MCI 16 track (12), field recording (14)
Madeleine Sosin – violin (1, 2, 7, 9, 11, 13)
Martin Wenk – trumpet (1, 2, 7, 13)

Charts

References

External links
 

2000 albums
Calexico (band) albums
Quarterstick Records albums